"Breaking Up My Heart" is a song by Welsh singer Shakin' Stevens, released in February 1985 as the third and final single from his Greatest Hits album. It peaked at number 14 on the UK Singles Chart. A limited pop-up gatefold sleeve version was also released, where Stevens pops up from the middle of the sleeve when opened.

Track listings 
7": Epic / A 6072 (UK)

 "Breaking Up My Heart" – 3:57
 "I'll Give You My Heart" – 2:54

12": Epic / TA 6072 (UK)

 "Breaking Up My Heart" (Extended Remix) – 6:55
 "I'll Give You My Heart" – 2:54

Charts

References 

1985 singles
1985 songs
Shakin' Stevens songs
Epic Records singles
Songs written by Bob Heatlie